Neoclytus senilis is a species of beetle in the family Cerambycidae. It was described by Johan Christian Fabricius in 1798.

References

Neoclytus
Beetles described in 1798